The 2013–14 ISU Speed Skating World Cup, officially the Essent ISU World Cup Speed Skating 2013–2014, was a series of international speed skating competitions that ran the entire season. The season started on 8 November 2013 in Calgary, Alberta, Canada, and concluded with the final on 16 March 2014 in Heerenveen, Netherlands. Compared to previous seasons, there were fewer competition weekends; the season was restricted due to the 2014 Winter Olympics, which were arranged in Sochi, Russia, during February 2014. In total, six competition weekends were held at six different locations, twelve cups were contested (six for men, and six for women), and 72 races took place.

The World Cup is organized by the International Skating Union (ISU).

Calendar
The detailed schedule for the season. Additionally, the team sprint was a demonstration event in Inzell.

Note: the men's 5000 and 10000 metres were contested as one cup, and the women's 3000 and 5000 metres were contested as one cup, as indicated by the color coding.

Entry rules

Qualification criteria

In order to qualify, skaters must have achieved the following results in ISU events, international competitions or national championships between 1 July 2012 and the entry deadline for the competition concerned.

 in the Olympic Oval, Calgary, or the Utah Olympic Oval, Salt Lake City
 in other ice rinks
 or 6:35.00 on 5000 m
 or 6:40.00 on 5000 m
 or 4:15.00 on 3000 m
 or 4:20.00 on 3000 m

For the mass start and team pursuit events, skaters who have achieved any one of the above results will qualify.

Nation quotas

Every ISU member nation may enter at least one competitor for each distance, subject to the qualification criteria above. Additionally, skaters placed among the top 36 in the final 2012–13 World Cup, or included in the final qualifying list (including the reserve list) of the 2013 World Single Distance Championships, for the distance category concerned, may be entered. Member nations not mentioned may enter maximum one skater for each distance.

For the mass start event, a member nation may enter maximum three skaters, all subject to the qualifying criteria above. For the team pursuit event, a member nation may enter one team only per category (men/women).

Competition format

Seeding of skaters

If the number of entered skaters exceeds a certain limit, skaters compete in two separate divisions, A and B. In the first competition, the composition of skaters in the respective division is determined by the ranking of the skaters in the respective distance category from the 2012–13 World Cup and the seeding submitted by the respective team leaders before the draw. For each country and distance category, the number of skaters in the ranking top of the previous year will decide the number of places available in Division A, but the team leader's seeding will decide which skater goes into which division.

In the following competitions, the current World Cup ranking is used, with special considerations to top-placed skaters in Division B of the previous competition. A skater may also under certain conditions apply for a wild card for Division A, but only the first time the skater participates in a distance category, and not in the first and last competitions of the season. In the last competition for the season, there will be no Division B.

Points system

Points tables

World Cup points for all competitions, except the last, are awarded in both divisions, using two sets of tables, A1/B1 and A2/B2. Tables A1 and B1 are used when the number of competitors in Division A exceeds 16, while tables A2 and B2 are used when that number is between 12 and 16. However, if table B1 was used for Division B in the first race in an event that is raced twice in the same competition, it will be used also in the second race, regardless of the number of competitors in Division A.

For the last competition, since there will be no Division B, points will be awarded using table A3.

Mass start ranking

The mass start races will be over 20 laps for men and 15 laps for women. There will be 3 intermediate sprints, at 5, 10 and 15 laps for men, and at 4, 8 and 12 laps for women. Race points will be awarded to the four first skaters at the intermediate sprints, and to the six first skaters at the final sprint. The accumulated points a skater collects during a race will decide the final ranking. For skaters who are tied in race points, including those who have failed to collect any, their finishing order will be break the tie.

Grand World Cup

In order to determine an overall World Cup winner, one for men and one for women, a special points system is used, awarding points for the top five skaters in each individual event.

Note: half points are awarded in distances that are skated twice in the same competition.

Prize money

Note: half amounts are awarded in distances that are skated twice in the same competition.

Additionally, the Grand World Cup winner of each category (men/women) is awarded $20000.

World records

World records going into the 2013–14 season.

Men

{| class="wikitable" border="1" style="text-align:center"
|-
! Distance
! Time
! Holder(s)
! Nat.
! Date
! Venue
! Reference
|-
| 500 m
| 34.03
| align=left | Jeremy Wotherspoon
| 
| align=right | 9 November 2007
| align=left | Utah Olympic Oval, Salt Lake City
| 
|-
| 1000 m
| 1:06.42
| align=left | Shani Davis
| 
| align=right | 7 March 2009
| align=left | Utah Olympic Oval, Salt Lake City
| 
|-
| 1500 m
| 1:41.04
| align=left | Shani Davis
| 
| align=right | 11 December 2009
| align=left | Utah Olympic Oval, Salt Lake City
| 
|-
| 5000 m
| 6:03.32
| align=left | Sven Kramer
| 
| align=right | 17 November 2007
| align=left | Olympic Oval, Calgary
| 
|-
| 10000 m
| 12:41.69
| align=left | Sven Kramer
| 
| align=right | 10 March 2007
| align=left | Utah Olympic Oval, Salt Lake City
| 
|-
| Team pursuit  (8 laps)
| 3:37.80
| align=left | Sven Kramer  Carl Verheijen  Erben Wennemars
| 
| align=right | 11 March 2007
| align=left | Utah Olympic Oval, Salt Lake City
| 
|}

On 9 November 2013, in the team pursuit race in Calgary, the Dutch team, comprised by Koen Verweij, Jan Blokhuijsen and Sven Kramer, broke the world record with a time of 3:37.17. The next weekend, on 16 November, the same skaters improved the record further, to 3:35.60.

Women

{| class="wikitable" border="1" style="text-align:center"
|-
! Distance
! Time
! Holder(s)
! Nat.
! Date
! Venue
! Reference
|-
| 500 m
| 36.80
| align=left | Lee Sang-hwa
| 
| align=right | 20 January 2013
| align=left | Olympic Oval, Calgary
| 
|-
| 1000 m
| 1:12.68
| align=left | Christine Nesbitt
| 
| align=right | 28 January 2012
| align=left | Olympic Oval, Calgary
| 
|-
| 1500 m
| 1:51.79
| align=left | Cindy Klassen
| 
| align=right | 20 November 2005
| align=left | Utah Olympic Oval, Salt Lake City
| 
|-
| 3000 m
| 3:53.34
| align=left | Cindy Klassen
| 
| align=right | 18 March 2006
| align=left | Olympic Oval, Calgary
| 
|-
| 5000 m
| 6:42.66
| align=left | Martina Sáblíková
| 
| align=right | 18 February 2011
| align=left | Utah Olympic Oval, Salt Lake City
| 
|-
| Team pursuit  (6 laps)
| 2:55.79
| align=left | Kristina Groves  Christine Nesbitt  Brittany Schussler
| 
| align=right | 6 December 2009
| align=left | Olympic Oval, Calgary
| 
|}

On 9 November 2013, in the second 500 metres race in Calgary, Lee Sang-hwa of South Korea improved her own world record with a time of 36.74 seconds. The next weekend, in Salt Lake City, Lee broke the record twice. First, on Friday, she lowered the record to 36.57 seconds. On Saturday, she improved it another 21/100, to 36.36 seconds. On Sunday, 17 November, also in Salt Lake City, Brittany Bowe broke the world record on 1000 metres with a time of 1:12.58.

Men's standings

500 m

1000 m

1500 m

5000 and 10000 m

Mass start

Team pursuit

Grand World Cup

Women's standings

500 m

1000 m

1500 m

3000 and 5000 m

Mass start

Team pursuit

Grand World Cup

References

External links 
International Skating Union

Results at ISUresults.eu

 
13-14
Isu Speed Skating World Cup, 2013-14
Isu Speed Skating World Cup, 2013-14